Bhim or Bhima is one of the central characters from the Hindu epic Mahabharata.

Bhim or Bhima may also refer to:

Animals 
Bhima (moth), a genus of moths in the family Lasiocampidae

Persons 
 Bhimrao Ambedkar, 20th century political leader in India
 Bhima I, 11th century king of Gujarat in India
 Bhima II, 13th century king of Gujarat in India
 Bhima of Mahikavati, 13th century king of Konkan in India
 Bhim Chand, Raja of Kahlur (also known as Bilaspur) from 1665 to 1692
 Bhim Singh of Amber, ruler of the kingdom of Amber from 1534 to 1537
 Bhim Singh of Mewar
 Bhim Singh Rana, ruler of the princely state Gohad in India from 1717 to 1756
 Bhim Singh II, the last ruling Maharaja of the princely state of Kotah from 1940 to 1947
 Bhim Singh (athlete) high jumper
 Bhim Singh (politician)
 Bhim Singh (wrestler) heavyweight freestyle wrestler
 Bhim Singh Thapa Nepalese commander died 1759

Places 
 Bhim Janmabhoomi, a memorial in Mhow (Dr. Ambedkar Nagar), Madhya Pradesh, India
 Bhim Public High School, the oldest high school in Dolakha District, Nepal
 Bhima River, a major river in southern India
 Bhima Ratha, a monument in the Pancha Rathas complex at Mahabalipuram, state of Tamil Nadu, India
 Koregaon Bhima, a panchayat village and census town in the state of Maharashtra, India, on the left (north) bank of the Bhima River
 Bhima Kunda, a tank/pond located beyond the western compound wall of the Bhimesvara Temple precinct, in Kapila Prasad, Bhubaneswar, India

Vehicles 
 Bhim SPH, a prototype self-propelled howitzer developed by Denel in 1999 and proposed to the Indian Army
 Bhim-class tugboat, a 3-ship tugboat class serving with the Indian Navy

See also 
 Bhim Singh (disambiguation)
 BHIM, an Indian cashless payment initiative